Pandanus ceylanicus is a monocot species of plant in the family Pandanaceae. It is endemic to Sri Lanka. It is a prostrate shrub.

Sources
 http://www.theplantlist.org/tpl/record/kew-285792

References
 http://mpnet.ior-rcstt.com/node/3358
 http://e-monocot.org/taxon/urn:kew.org:wcs:taxon:285792
 http://plants.jstor.org/specimen/br0000006941772?history=true&

Endemic flora of Sri Lanka
ceylanicus
Plants described in 1878
Taxa named by Hermann zu Solms-Laubach